Kyrgyzstan competed at the 2002 Winter Olympics in Salt Lake City, United States. Biathlete Aleksandr Tropnikov and ski jumper Dmitry Chvykov were the only competitors for the country at these Olympics.

Biathlon

Men

 1 A penalty loop of 150 metres had to be skied per missed target. 
 3 One minute added per missed target.

Ski jumping

References
Official Olympic Reports
sports-reference

Nations at the 2002 Winter Olympics
2002
2002 in Kyrgyzstani sport